The 2006 Connecticut gubernatorial election occurred on November 7, 2006. Incumbent Republican Jodi Rell became governor when John G. Rowland resigned on corruption charges in 2004. Rell had an approval rating of 70% as of October 19, 2006, and polls showed her leading the Democratic nominee, New Haven mayor John DeStefano by a near 30-point margin. As expected, she won the election to a full term in a landslide. DeStefano defeated Stamford Mayor Dannel Malloy in the Connecticut Democratic gubernatorial primary on August 8. , this was the last time a Republican was elected Governor of Connecticut, and the last time any gubernatorial candidate won every county in the state.

Republican Primary

Candidates
Jodi Rell, incumbent governor
Running mate: Michael Fedele, State Representative

Results
Governor Rell was unopposed for renomination.

Democratic primary

Candidates

Declared
John DeStefano, Jr., Mayor of New Haven 
Running mate: Mary Glassman, Simsbury First Selectman
Dannel Malloy, Mayor of Stamford

Declined
 Richard Blumenthal, Connecticut Attorney General
 Chris Dodd, United States Senator
 Susan Bysiewicz, Connecticut Secretary of State

Results

Convention

Primary

Independents and third parties

Green Party
Cliff Thornton, retired businessman; drug policy reform advocate; U.S. Army veteran

Concerned Citizens Party
Joseph A. Zdonczyk, retired businessman; U.S. Army veteran; Concerned Citizens Party founder

Independent
John M. Joy (write-in candidate)

Campaign

Predictions

Polling

Results
The following are the results of the 2006 election:

Rell won every county and all but seven towns. Notably, DeStefano won the capital city of Hartford, the largest city of Bridgeport, and his hometown of New Haven.

See also
U.S. gubernatorial elections, 2006
State of Connecticut
Governors of Connecticut
Dan Malloy

References

External links
State of Connecticut Secretary of State: 2006 Primary and Election Information
State of Connecticut Secretary of State: Statement of Vote
Bysiewicz for Governor
DeStefano for Governor
Malloy for Governor
Miner for Governor
Rell for Governor
Thornton for Governor

Gubernatorial
2006
Connecticut